Haby may refer to:

People
  (1922-2006), French politician
  (1861-1938), German hairdresser
 Haby Niaré (born 1993), French taekwondo practitioner
 Jean-Yves Haby (born 1955), French politician
 René Haby (1919–2003), French politician

Places
 Haby, Schleswig-Holstein, Germany